Megachile coloradensis is a species of bee in the family Megachilidae. It was described by Mitchell in 1936.

References

Coloradensis
Insects described in 1936